James "Iron Head" Baker (March 18, 1884 – February 23, 1944) and Moses "Clear Rock" Platt (around 1867 – after 1939) were African American traditional folk singers imprisoned in the Central State Prison Farm in Sugar Land, Texas. The men made a number of field recordings of convict work songs, field hollers and other material with John Lomax for the Library of Congress Archive of American Folk Music in the 1930s.

After Lomax was refused entry to the Huntsville Penitentiary, in July 1933, the pair would become the first two convicts in Texas that Lomax was permitted to record. Both men performed solo, but responded to and encouraged one another. This gave Lomax an overview of the idiom and a number of songs to seek out in future collecting. Over the years a number of their recordings have been released on 78 rpm, on LP and on CD by the Library of Congress and other record labels.

Singers

Iron Head 

James Baker was his prison name. He was generally referred to by his nickname Iron Head. His real name may have been Reuben Avery Burrage. When first recorded by the Lomaxes in July 1933 he was sixty-three years old and in his sixth term in the penitentiary. John Lomax, attempting to depict Iron Head's dialect, quotes him proudly claiming to be: "De roughest nigger what ever walked de streets of Dallas. In de pen off an' on fo' thirty fo' years. .. I'se a H.B.C. — habitual criminal, you know. Not even Ma Ferguson can pardon me" (a reference to the then Governor of Texas). In reality he was a minor criminal, guilty of nothing more violent than burglary, but sentenced to ninety-nine years as a repeat offender. Iron Head was a trusty with a measure of responsibility and control over other prisoners. He was initially reluctant to sing a sad song because it might make him want to run away and lose his "easy job".

Clear Rock

Moses Platt was his prison name. His real name, if different, is unknown. He was generally referred to by his nickname Clear Rock because of a link to a triple homicide. He told the Lomaxes he got the name because he killed three people by throwing rocks at them. For that he was given a life sentence but he "got pardoned out". But then he "took up with" a young woman he described as "a li'l yeller gal" ignorant, he claimed, that she was in fact only 14 years old. Denounced by enemies, he was recalled to serve his life sentence. When first recorded in 1933 he was 71 years old, having spent 47 years in the Texas prison system. Like Iron Head he proudly described himself as "a habitual". Clear Rock was later pardoned by Governor Ferguson. According to John Lomax, this was after singing Long John to her when she visited his convict camp. According to Clear Rock (in Lomax's spelling):
 "One day some of my friends in Taylor heard that Miz Ferguson wuz goin' down to Central Farm a visitin' and they sent a car down there with a letter signed by 30,000 peoples, they wuz de names of all de prominent lawyers an' officers and all other whichocrats around `Taylor, an Miz Ferguso set me free." 
To this, Lomax added "The population of Taylor is less than 5,000."

Lomax's appreciation for Clear Rock is summarised by Szwed: [He] "seemed to possess an endless body of songs. He also was something of a folklorists dream as he knew any number of individual songs, and was able to make up several new ones on the spot. He never sang the same song twice."

Recordings
Lomax was assisted by Alan, his son who described the first 1933 session as a collaborative effort.
"We wrote down and recorded the songs of Clear Rock and Iron Head for a day and a night, and Clear Rock was still indefatigitably improvising. Those two wore us out."

John Lomax devoted a chapter to the two singers in his autobiographical Adventures of a Ballad Hunter.

The Lomaxes' appreciation for Iron Head is summarised by Alan's biographer John Szwed: [His] "deep knowledge of songs led John to dub him a black Homer. Baker lived his songs, feeling their emotions viscerally". John Lomax developed an affection for Iron Head, visiting him when in Texas and sending small gifts of money. Iron Head showed his gratitude with a hand-made gift for Ruby Terrill Lomax, John's second wife, and a card for Christmas 1935. This prompted Lomax to arrange for Iron Head to be paroled so that he could assist Lomax in his collecting sessions in other Southern prisons. This was the role fulfilled the previous year by Lead Belly, except that Iron Head was unable to act as chauffeur. At the end of the engagement, Iron Head was to be set up in business exploiting the handicraft skills he had learned in the penitentiary. The Lead Belly partnership had ended in bitter dispute, and the break-up with Iron Head was initially as heated with Iron Head feeling betrayed and Lomax feeling that Iron Head was irredeemable and ungrateful. On his return to Texas, Iron Head was met by Alan Lomax and helped to find work by Ruby Lomax. Within a year, he was caught burglaring again and returned to prison. The break with Lomax was not permanent. In a letter written in 1941 to his son Alan, John quoted Iron Head as telling him "Crime don't pay. I'm walking the straight road now and won't turn back."

Alan was particularly excited by Clear Rock's performance of Bobby Allen (Barbara Allen) which incorporated elements from different textual traditions and different traditional ballads, and by his extended version of the cowboy song of The Old Chisholm Trail. His extempore verses ended in Alan Lomax'x account
"... with the cowboy pitched off his pinto and lying hung in a mesquite tree. 
"Clear Rock, you left that cowboy in a very uncomfortable position, sprawled across that limb."''''Lemme git him down, Boss. Lemme git him down," he said eagerly.
"Cowboy lyin' on a limb a sprawlin'Come a little win', and down he come a falliin'With a bum-ti-hiddle-um-a yeah, yum-a-yeahWith a bum-ti-hiddle-um-a-yeah''"

Discography
Many of the songs by Iron Head and Clear Rock remain unreleased. This is a list of their songs issued in collections, in order of publication:

Library of Congress AFS L3: Afro-American Spirituals, Work Songs, And Ballads (1942)
78 rpm album, later reissued on LP and CD

Library of Congress AFS L4: Afro-American Blues And Game Songs (1942)
78 rpm album, later reissued on LP and CD

Library of Congress AFS L8 Negro Work Songs And Calls (1943)
78 rpm album, later reissued on LP and CD (These titles were previously released as 78rpm AAFS 38)

Library of Congress AAFS L54: Versions and variants of Barbara Allen (1964)
LP

Document Records: Field Recordings Vol 6 Texas (1997)
CD

Document Records: Field Recordings Vol 13 Texas Louisiana Arkansas Mississippi Florida Alabama Georgia Tennessee South Carolona Delaware (1997)
CD

Deep River Of Song: Black Texicans - Balladeers and Songsters of the Texas Frontier (1999)
CD

Deep River Of Song: Big Brazos - Texas Prison Recordings, 1933 and 1934 (2000)
CD

WVU Press Sound Archive Volume Nine: Jail House Bound — John Lomax's First Southern Prison recordings, 1933 (2012)
CD

CD

References

American folk singers
Prison music
Prisoners and detainees of Texas